Live At Rockpalast is the first DVD/CD compilation from Canadian singer Dalbello, showcasing her performance at Rockpalast Bochum, Germany, on 1 October 1985. The physical release was originally slated for release on 15 June 2015, with an MP3 release on 5 June 2015, but was pushed back to 29 June 2015. This release is the first time the performance has ever been commercially available, and features restored concert footage and remastered audio. In addition, it is also the first ever commercial Dalbello release since her latest album, whore, released in 1996.

Track listing

Personnel 
 Lisa Dal Bello : Vocals 
 Rob Yale : Keyboards, Fairlight CMI
 Asher Horowitz : Guitar 
 Steve Webster : Bass 
 Kevin McKenzie : Drums

References 

2015 albums
Lisa Dalbello albums